King Xiaocheng of Zhao (reigned 265 BCE – 245 BCE) was a king of the State of Zhao during the Warring States period of ancient China. His reign saw the decline of Zhao military power owing to the catastrophic defeat by the State of Qin at the Battle of Changping.

King Xiaocheng ascended to the throne in the midst of a military stalemate between the Qin and the Zhao over the status of Shangdang, which Han had ceded to Zhao during the reign of King Huiwen. The commander in charge of Zhao forces, Lian Po, opted for a defensive strategy of fort construction. Perhaps due to Qin accusations of Lian Po's cowardice, King Xiaocheng decided in 260 BCE to replace him with Zhao Kuo, regardless of objections from the leading politician Lin Xiangru. Zhao Kuo's offensive strategy played right into the hands of Qin general Bai Qi, and ultimately cost Zhao the battle and, with it, Zhao's military pre-eminence.

King Xiaocheng died in 245 BCE and was succeeded by his son and heir, King Daoxiang of Zhao.

Notes and references

 Zhao Guo Shi Gao (Draft History of the Zhao State), Shen Changyun, Zhonghua Book Company, China.

Monarchs of Zhao (state)
Chinese kings
3rd-century BC Chinese monarchs
Zhou dynasty nobility
Zhao (state)